The following articles relate to the topic climate registry
The California Climate Action Registry
The Climate Registry in North America